Arthroceras is a genus of snipe fly of the family Rhagionidae. Arthroceras are mid-sized to large , black, grey, or yellowish-colored flies that have a fairly long, tapering antenna consisting of 5–8 flagellomeres. Within Rhagonidae, the genus is sometimes(?) placed in the subfamily Arthrocerinae, in which it is the only genus.

Species
A. fulvicorne Nagatomi, 1966 – Neotropic
A. fulvicorne nigricapite Nagatomi, 1966
A. fulvicorne subsolanum Nagatomi, 1966
A. subaquilum Nagatomi, 1966 – Neotropic
A. gadi (Paramonov, 1929) – Palearctic
A. japonicum Nagatomi, 1954 – Palearctic
A. leptis (Osten Sacken, 1878) – Neotropic
A. pollinosum Williston, 1886 – Neotropic
A. rubrifrons Nagatomi, 1966 – Palearctic
A. sinense (Ouchi, 1943) – Palearctic

References

Rhagionidae
Brachycera genera
Diptera of Asia
Diptera of North America
Taxa named by Samuel Wendell Williston